The following is a compilation of notable records and statistics for teams and players in and seasons of the Women's United Soccer Association.

Champions and regular season winners

Scoring

Players

Games

All-time successes and records

Tiebreak for otherwise identical records is most recent success, followed by highest average regular season rank

Regular Season records

Playoff records

1Ties after 90min decided by two 7.5min golden goal overtime periods, followed by shootout if still tiedSort order is Pts, appearance%, finishing position

Attendance

See also 

 Women's soccer in the United States
 WPS records and statistics
 NWSL records and statistics

References

Records and statistics
All-time football league tables
Association football league records and statistics
Women's association football records and statistics